Jung Yeon-joo (born 13 February 1990) is a South Korean actress and model. Jung is known for her roles in Queen of Mystery, Chicago Typewriter.

Biography and career
She graduated from the Korea National University of Arts and made her debut in the 2011 short movie Guest. She played a small supporting role in drama I Remember You. She then appeared in a number of hit drama series titles such as Queen of Mystery, Chicago Typewriter, and Forest.

Filmography

Television

Film

Awards and nominations
 2011 The 5th Great Short Film Festival Great Actress Award
 2012 Clermont Ferrand International Short Film Festival Best Actress Award

References

External links 
 
 
 

Living people
21st-century South Korean actresses
South Korean female models
South Korean television actresses
1990 births
South Korean film actresses
Korea National University of Arts alumni